Richard T. Baillie is a British–American economist and statistician who is currently the A J Pasant Professor of Economics at the Michigan State University. He is also part time professor at King's College, London, and Senior Scientific Officer for the Rimini Center for Economic Analysis in Italy, and also on the Executive Council of the Society for Nonlinear Dynamics in Econometrics (SNDE).

Education and Career 

He obtained his PhD from the London School of Economics & Political Science, where his doctoral advisors were Kenneth F. Wallis and James Durbin. He also has an MSc from the University of Kent and a BSc from Middlesex University.

He is an elected fellow of the American Statistical Association, the Journal of Econometrics and also the International Institute for Applied Econometrics. He was also given the Distinguished Faculty Award at Michigan State University.

He has held full time appointments at the University of Birmingham, Georgetown University, Queen Mary University of London and the Michigan State University. He has been Research Fellow at the Australian National University also been visiting professor at the University of California San Diego, University of Toronto, Wayne State University and Arizona State University.

Research 
His research is mainly on time series econometrics; and he has made both theoretical and applied contributions. He has also worked extensively on international finance and more general asset pricing issues in financial markets. He was one of the five founding editors of the Journal of Empirical Finance.
He has over 19,000 citations on Google Scholar and an h statistic of 46.

Scientific Research Contributions 
Baillie's main area of research has been the development and application of time series analysis in econometrics. His early work was on properties of predictions from dynamic models, including regressions with autocorrelated errors and Vector Autoregressions (VARs). This work derived results for optimal predictors and evaluated the uncertainty introduced by parameter estimation. He also did related work on inference from Impulse Response Functions from various dynamic models.

Baillie has also published contributions to testing the theory of rational expectations in financial markets; most notably advocating VAR approaches over single equation methodology. He has published work on models of volatility, particularly with GARCH models, including applications to modeling risk premium, and various applications in international finance including the effectiveness of sterilized central bank intervention.
Baillie has published extensively on long memory processes, and also has highly cited survey article and the long memory FIGARCH model with Tim Bollerslev and Mikkelsen, been widely used in empirical work and has also been the seed of a large theoretical literature.

Articles

References

External links 
 Richard Baillie's homepage

1948 births
Living people
Alumni of the London School of Economics
21st-century American economists
British emigrants to the United States
20th-century American economists
Alumni of the University of Kent
Econometricians
British economists
Alumni of Middlesex University
Academics of Queen Mary University of London
Academics of the University of Birmingham
Georgetown University faculty
Michigan State University faculty